"Strong Enough To Save" is a song by Christian band Tenth Avenue North from their 2010 album, The Light Meets the Dark. It was released on April 20, 2010, as the second single. The song became the band's second Hot Christian Songs No. 1, staying there for three weeks. It lasted 42 weeks on the overall chart. The song is played in an E major key, at 130 beats per minute.

Charts

Weekly charts

Year-end charts

References

2010 songs
2010 singles
Tenth Avenue North songs
Reunion Records singles
Songs written by Jason Ingram